William David Arnett (born 1940) is a Regents Professor of Astrophysics at Steward Observatory, University of Arizona, known for his research on supernova explosions, the formation of  neutron stars or black holes by gravitational collapse, and the synthesis of elements in stars; he is author of the monograph Supernovae and Nucleosynthesis which deals with these topics.
Arnett pioneered the application of supercomputers to astrophysical problems, including neutrino radiation hydrodynamics, nuclear reaction networks, instabilities and explosions, supernova light curves, and turbulent convective flow in two  and three dimensions.

Academic career
Arnett received his BS degree from the University of Kentucky in 1961 and his MS and PhD degrees in physics from Yale University in 1963 and 1965, advised by A. G. W. Cameron. After postdoctoral work with W. A. Fowler  at the California Institute of Technology and Fred Hoyle at the Institute of Theoretical Astronomy (now Institute of Astronomy) of Cambridge University, he served briefly on the faculties of Rice University (working with Donald Clayton), University of Texas and University of Illinois before becoming the B. and E. Sunny Distinguished Service Professor at the University of Chicago and then Regents Professor  at the University of Arizona.

Honors and awards
Henry Norris Russell Lectureship of the American Astronomical Society, 2012.
 Marcel Grossmann Award, International Center for Relativistic Astrophysics (ICRA), 2012
Hans Bethe Prize of the American Physical Society, 2009

 S. Chandrasekhar Lecturer, S.N. Bose National Centre for Basic Sciences, Kolkata, India, 2007
 Fellow of the American Physical Society, 1987 
 Member, National Academy of Sciences, 1985
 Member, American Academy of Arts and Sciences, 1985
 Alexander von Humboldt Prize (senior scientist), 1981
 Yale University Distinguished Graduate Award in Physical Sciences and Engineering (with J. W. Truran), 1980
 University of Kentucky Honorary Doctorate of Sciences, 2016
 Fellow of the American Astronomical Society, 2020

References

1940 births
Living people
American astrophysicists
University of Kentucky alumni
Yale Graduate School of Arts and Sciences alumni
Rice University faculty
University of Texas faculty
University of Illinois faculty
University of Chicago faculty
University of Arizona faculty
Fellows of the American Physical Society
Fellows of the American Astronomical Society